Rajiv Highway(SH-1) రాజీవ్ రహదారి is a Four lane express Toll road in Northern Telangana, India. The highway is managed by Hyderabad - Karimnagar - Ramagundam (HKR) Roadways, Ltd. The Highway begins at Shamirpet ORR Entrance in Hyderabad and joins NH-63 at the Indaram Jaipur mandal of Mancherial district.

Alternate names
 Rajiv Rahadaari - రాజీవ్ రహదారి ,राजीव सडक
 Rajiv Highway
 Telangana State SH-1 ( Formerly Andhra Pradesh SH-1)
 Hyderabad-Karimnagar-Ramagundam Road (HKRR)

Toll plazas
Toll Plaza-1 km.91.450 (Duddeda, Siddipet)
Toll Plaza-2 km.140.050 (Renikunta, Karimnagar)
Toll Plaza-3 km.208.100 (Basanth nagar, Kesoram Cement Factory, Near Ramagundam Airport)

See also
 List of State Highways in Telangana

References

External links
 
 
 
 
 
 

State Highways in Telangana